William Leon Barmore (born June 3, 1944) is a college women's basketball coach best known for his 35-year association with the Louisiana Tech University Lady Techsters.  After five years as an assistant coach, he served as head coach from 1982 to 2002, serving the first three years as co-head coach with Sonja Hogg, who had begun the program in 1974. Upon his retirement, Barmore's .869 winning percentage was the best in major college basketball history, for both men and women's basketball. His nine appearances in the Final Four was second most in NCAA women's basketball history, and as of 2023 it is tied for fourth most all-time.  Barmore was inducted into the Women's Basketball Hall of Fame in 2003.

Early years
Barmore was born June 3, 1944 in Ruston, Louisiana to Jasper Barmore and Flora McCurry. He earned All-State honors as a basketball player at Ruston High School, helping his team to two state championships.  He went on to play basketball at Louisiana Tech, serving as captain of the team and earned Gulf States All-Conference honors. In his first coaching job after graduation, he coached the boys basketball team at Bastrop High School where his teams recorded a record of 84–41. In 1971, he moved to his alma mater Ruston High School, where he remained until 1977, and coached the team to a  record of 148–49.

Louisiana Tech
Barmore joined the Louisiana Tech staff in 1977, nominally as Hogg's top assistant.  In truth, Barmore handled nearly all game strategy.  He was named associate head coach in 1980 and co-head coach in 1982.  He took over the reins full-time in 1985, when Hogg left Ruston.

In 20 years as either co-head coach or head coach, Barmore never suffered a losing season and only failed to win 20 games once.  He tallied an amazing 13 30-plus win campaigns while also coaching the Lady Techsters to 20 straight NCAA Tournaments, nine Final Fours (including eight in a row from 1983 to 1990), five national championship games and the 1988 national title.  He also led Tech to 13 regular season titles in 15 years as a member of either the American South, Sun Belt or Western Athletic conferences, including 10 in a row from 1992 to 2002. When Barmore coached Tech to a 31–5 mark in 2000–01, he became the first coach in Division I college basketball history to record six straight 30-plus win seasons. He was the fastest to reach 450 victories, achieving that accomplishment in 520 games.

Barmore coached 12 Kodak All-Americans, 14 players who have been selected in the WNBA Draft, and 37 first team all-conference selections.

Barmore was awarded the US Basketball Writers Association (USBWA) Coach of the Year award in 1996, as well as the 1996 Russell Athletic/WBCA National Coach of the Year

Baylor University

In 2008, Leon decided to resume his coaching career at Baylor University, where he was an assistant under former Louisiana Tech player Kim Mulkey, who played under Barmore from 1980 to 1984 and was his top assistant from 1985 to 2000. In the first round of the 2009 NCAA Tournament, Barmore served as Baylor's interim head coach and led the Bears to an overtime victory over UT-San Antonio (Mulkey missed the game with an illness). Both Mulkey and Barmore are members of the Women's Basketball Hall of Fame (Mulkey as a player and Barmore as a coach) and the Basketball Hall of Fame.

Head coaching record

Coaching tree
Eight former assistant coaches under head coach Leon Barmore have become head women's basketball coaches.
Gary Blair – Stephen F. Austin, Arkansas, Texas A&M
Kurt Budke – Louisiana Tech, Oklahoma State
Kristy Curry – Purdue, Texas Tech, Alabama
Nell Fortner – Purdue, Team USA, Indiana Fever, Auburn
Stacy Johnson-Klein – Fresno State
Chris Long – Louisiana Tech
Kim Mulkey – Baylor, LSU
Jennifer White – St. Edward's

Notes

References

External links
 
 Louisiana Tech profile

1944 births
Living people
American men's basketball players
American women's basketball coaches
Basketball coaches from Louisiana
Basketball players from Louisiana
Baylor Bears women's basketball coaches
High school basketball coaches in Louisiana
Louisiana Tech Bulldogs basketball players
Louisiana Tech Lady Techsters basketball coaches
Naismith Memorial Basketball Hall of Fame inductees
Sportspeople from Ruston, Louisiana